Polygala fruticosa is a species of flowering plant in the milkwort family (Polygalaceae). It is native to Mozambique and South Africa. It was first described by Peter Jonas Bergius in 1767. According to the Red List of South African Plants, it is of least ecological concern.

References

fruticosa
Flora of Mozambique
Flora of South Africa